Ethan Roots (born in New Zealand) is a New Zealand rugby union player who plays for the Ospreys. His playing position is flanker. He played for the Crusaders in 2020. He signed for Ospreys in July 2021.

Reference list

External links
itsrugby.co.uk profile

New Zealand rugby union players
Living people
Rugby union flankers
North Harbour rugby union players
Crusaders (rugby union) players
Ospreys (rugby union) players
1999 births